El Espíritu del Vino (Spanish for "The Spirit of Wine") is the third studio album by the Spanish rock band Héroes del Silencio, released in 1993. A double disc special edition was released in December 2006 on EMI. A 20th anniversary edition was released in 2013 with remixed versions of the original tracks including a documentary of the band during their recordings .

History 
After a hiatus (vacation) from the long exhausting tour of the Senda tour, the group would return in December of 1992. The group would work with producer with Phil Manzanera once again, Manzanera would set the group with a house in Chertsey, England and would begin to write material. Bunbury decided to make it a double album which was above the average compared to their other albums.  During this time the group would struggle with drugs and substances and was the starting point where Bunbury and Valdivia would have tension. 

It is said that Bunbury first thought and wrote the song, "Sirena Varada" while he was high.  

It was also there that Valdivia was playing "Brazos de la fiebre" which would eventually release in Avalancha 

Recorded in 1993, the album contains hard rock songs and the lyrics were written by Enrique Bunbury.

The album had five singles: "Nuestros Nombres", "Los Placeres de la Pobreza", "Flor de Loto", "Sirena Varada" and "La Herida". In August 1993, 150,000 copies had been sold on the Spanish market. Due to their success in Germany, the band released one of their festival performances on DVD. The song "Nuestros Nombres" got to first position in the Spanish charts and was a success in other countries as well.

This was the first album to include the first 2 songs of the Bendecida series, the 3rd song being "La chispa adecuada"

After recording and releasing the album, they would commence on a one year tour, "El camino del exceso" tour. Taking them throughout Europe and Latin America

Track listing

Personnel
 Enrique Bunbury - vocalist
 Joaquin Cardiel - Bass guitar
 Juan Valdivia - Guitar
 Pedro Andreu - Drums

Additional personnel
 Copi Corellano - Organ, piano
 Phil Manzanera - Guitar

Chart positions

References

External links
[ El Espíritu del Vino] overview at Allmusic
Héroes del Silencio official Site

Héroes del Silencio albums
1993 albums
Albums produced by Phil Manzanera
EMI Records albums
Spanish-language albums